Japhet Phumlani Zwane (born 10 January 1974) is a South African former footballer who played as a left winger.

Career

Club
On 20 February 2003, Rostselmash announced the signing of Zwane and fellow South African Rowan Hendricks.

Career Statistics

International

Statistics accurate as of match played 3 July 2004

References

External links

1974 births
South African soccer players
South Africa international soccer players
Living people
FC Rostov players
South African expatriate soccer players
Russian Premier League players
Expatriate footballers in Russia
Sportspeople from Durban
Moroka Swallows F.C. players
Association football midfielders
Lamontville Golden Arrows F.C. players
AmaZulu F.C. players
Manning Rangers F.C. players